Cneorum tricoccon, the spurge olive, is a small shrub of the family Rutaceae, native to Europe in the western Mediterranean Region.

Description
The plant which is nearly round and evergreen in color. The yellowish  flowers occur from June to July, and their seeds ripen from August to September. The spurge olive plant is also hermaphroditic.

Cneorum tricoccon prefers light sandy soils that are common in the Mediterranean and also requires soils that drain particularly well. Spurge olive must have considerable sunlight to grow, and often stunts when in much of shade.

Uses
Its fruit has no food value. The plant is rich in tannin, and can be used as a source of fuel.

References

External links

Cneoroideae
Flora of Southwestern Europe
Plants described in 1753
Taxa named by Carl Linnaeus